Perdido Street Station is a novel by British writer China Miéville, published in 2000 by Macmillan. Often described as weird fiction, it is set in a world where both magic and steampunk technology exist. It won the Arthur C. Clarke Award and was ranked by Locus as the 6th all-time best fantasy novel published in the 20th century.

Perdido Street Station is the first of three independent works set in the fictional world of Bas-Lag, and is followed by The Scar and Iron Council.

Background
Perdido Street Station is set in the fictional world of Bas-Lag, in the large city-state of New Crobuzon; the title refers to a railway station at the heart of the city. Miéville described the book as "basically a secondary world fantasy with Victorian era technology. So rather than being a feudal world, it's an early industrial capitalist world of a fairly grubby, police statey kind!".

The book was published simultaneously in the UK and Australia in March 2000 by Macmillan. The UK edition was a hardcover, while the Australian version was a trade paperback; it featured a cover by Edward Miller and was marketed as a dark fantasy novel. A US paperback followed in March 2001 from Ballantine Del Rey.

Plot
Isaac Dan der Grimnebulin is a scientist living in the city of New Crobuzon. He is approached by Yagharek, a member of a birdlike species known as garuda, who has had his wings removed as a punishment for an undisclosed crime in his native land. He asks Isaac to help him to fly again. Isaac agrees and starts collecting flying creatures for research purposes with the aid of Lemuel Pigeon, a fence with links to the criminal underworld. One creature is a large and unusual caterpillar, stolen from a government research lab. The caterpillar sickens until Isaac accidentally discovers it feeds on a popular hallucinogenic drug. It grows and starts to pupate. After reaching maturity, it emerges as a monstrous flying beast known as a slakemoth, able to paralyse its victims using hypnotic patterns on its wings. It escapes after eating the mind of one of Isaac's colleagues, leaving him catatonic. Isaac, Yagharek and Lemuel resolve to re-capture or destroy it.

Isaac's girlfriend Lin is a khepri, an insect-like humanoid and an artist. She is commissioned by Mr Motley, a mob boss, to make a sculpture of him. Mr. Motley has four more of the slakemoths in captivity and harvests their milk to sell as drugs. After Isaac's slakemoth frees its siblings, Mr Motley discovers Isaac's connection to the slakemoths. Assuming Isaac to be a potential rival in the drug trade, he imprisons Lin, demanding that Isaac return his creatures. The slakemoths start to terrorise New Crobuzon, feeding on its inhabitants.

With the aid of Derkhan, a journalist and friend of Lin, Isaac discovers that Mr. Motley purchased his slakemoths from the government. The security forces become aware of the activities of the slakemoths and begin to suppress the various rebellious elements within the city. To re-capture the slakemoths, they attempt to enlist the help of demons and the Weaver, a spider-like creature who moves through dimensions, obsessed with patterns and its own peculiar view of beauty. The demons refuse to assist and the Weaver soon ends up aiding Isaac.

Isaac and his friends kill one of the slakemoths with the aid of a sentient machine known as the Construct Council. They then destroy the eggs that the slakemoths have laid before laying a trap for the remainder of the creatures. The trap is mostly successful, but the last slakemoth escapes and returns 'home' to Mr. Motley's facility. The Weaver transports Isaac to the warehouse where they find Lin, who has been tortured but is still working on the sculpture. A confrontation occurs, during which Lin's mind is half eaten and the last slakemoth is killed by Mr. Motley's men. Isaac escapes with Lin and Yagharek and prepares to leave the city. Isaac learns of Yagharek's crime, a rape of one of his own species, and declines to help him fly again. Lin never fully recovers and Yagharek is left alone in the city, pulling out his feathers and having to accept his new flightless identity.

Characters
Isaac Dan der Grimnebulin, a human scientist, dabbling in all fields but obsessed with his pet theory of "crisis energy". Lover to Lin, and close friends with Derkhan Blueday.
Yagharek, an exiled and de-winged garuda from the Cymek Desert, far south of New Crobuzon. He comes to Isaac to have his flight restored, willing to accept any method or price.
Lin, Isaac's khepri lover, an artist who is commissioned by the gangster Mr. Motley to create a sculpture of his form.
Derkhan Blueday, a middle-aged journalist and seditionist, co-editor of the underground newspaper Runagate Rampant.
Lemuel Pigeon, Isaac's contact with New Crobuzon's criminal underworld.
Mr. Motley, New Crobuzon's most feared ganglord, who runs a dreamshit harvesting operation, among many other nefarious activities. He has altered his body many times through remaking, into an amorphous collection of body parts and appendages.
Mayor Bentham Rudgutter, the corrupt mayor of New Crobuzon who bargains with crime syndicates and demons alike.
MontJohn Rescue, an ambassador of the feared handlingers (powerful parasites who take over other species as hosts), working for the mayor.
Lublamai Dadscatt, a researcher who shares lab space with David Serachin and Isaac Dan der Grimnebulin, first victim of the slakemoth.
David Serachin, shares lab space with Isaac and Lublamai.
Teafortwo, a dim-witted and friendly wyrman who runs small favours for Isaac.
Construct Council, a hive-mind artificial intelligence formed in the city's rubbish dump. It controls many constructs (simplistic robots originally engineered for janitorial and other purposes) in New Crobuzon.
The Weaver, a multi-dimensional being in the form of a giant spider, who speaks in a never-ending torrent of free-verse poetry.

Reception
Michael Moorcock, reviewing the book for The Spectator, called it "a massive and gorgeously detailed parallel-world fantasy" with "a range of rather more exotic creatures, all of whom are wonderfully drawn," and praised Mieville as "a writer with a rare descriptive gift, an unusually observant eye for physical detail, for the sensuality and beauty of the ordinarily human as well as the thoroughly alien." However, he suggests "Mieville's determination to deliver value for money, a great page-turner, leads him to add genre borrowings which set up a misleading expectation of the kind of plot you're going to get and make individuals start behaving out of character, forcing the author into rationalisations at odds with the creative, intellectual and imaginative substance of the book." The novel was listed as an Amazon.com Editors' Choice Book in fantasy in 2001. In May 2009, it was made available as an audiobook from Random House.

Awards
Perdido Street Station was nominated for numerous prizes spanning the genres of science fiction and fantasy for instance, both the British Fantasy Award and British Science Fiction Association Award and won several honours, as detailed in the following table. It was also featured in Locus poll of all-time best 20th century fantasy novels, where it ranked 6th place.

Notes

References

Further reading

External links

Runagate Rampant: Perdido Street Station description, list of awards, publication history, and annotations.
Perdido Street Station at Worlds Without End

2000 British novels
Dystopian novels
Science fantasy novels
2000 science fiction novels
Steampunk novels
Bas-Lag
Novels by China Miéville
Weird fiction novels
Macmillan Publishers books